After B.K.S. Iyengar is an abstract bronze sculpture, by Robert Engman, that commemorates B. K. S. Iyengar's 1976 visit to the United States.

It is located at Morris Arboretum, 9414 Meadowbrook Avenue, English Park Step Garden, Philadelphia. 
It was dedicated in September 1988.

Another casting is at the Annmarie Sculpture Garden, Solomons, Maryland, on loan from the Hirshhorn Museum and Sculpture Garden.

The statute was originally sited at Cobble Court, the historic house built by J. H. Carstair and owned by Marvin and Marian Garfinkel. Iyengar was a guest of the Garfinkels when he visited Philadelphia in 1976 and gave a public demonstration of yoga at Haverford College. Artist Robert Engman was one of the Garfinkels' neighbors.

See also
List of public art in Philadelphia

References

External links
'After B.K.S. Iyengar', in the Morris Arboretum, Philadelphia

Sculptures in Pennsylvania
Collection of the Smithsonian Institution
1978 sculptures
Bronze sculptures in Maryland
Bronze sculptures in Pennsylvania